Saint Patrick School is a private Catholic school (kindergarten to eighth), located in San Jose, California. Founded in 1925, the school's historic gothic revival campus is located in Downtown San Jose, next to the Our Lady of La Vang Church, and designated as a city landmark.

History
The school was founded in 1925, by the Sisters of the Presentation, through the patronage of prominent local figure Edward McLaughlin. The Sisters of the Presentation continued management of the school until 1985.

In 2004, the Daughters of Charity of Saint Vincent de Paul were selected by the Roman Catholic Diocese of San Jose in California to run the school.

Notable alumni
Viet Thanh Nguyen, Pulitzer Prize-winning journalist
Phil DiNapoli, prominent real estate developer

References

External links 

Saint Patrick School official website

Private schools in San Jose, California
Roman Catholic Diocese of San Jose in California
Catholic elementary schools in California